May-Ya-Moto is a volcano in the east of the Democratic Republic of the Congo.

See also
 List of volcanoes in the Democratic Republic of the Congo

Volcanoes of the Democratic Republic of the Congo